Ganeshana Galate is a 1995 Kannada film directed by Phani Ramachandra. J. M. Prahlad wrote the story, which uses Phani Ramachandra's favourite screen-title Ganesha. Shashikumar replaced Ananth Nag in the titular character.

The movie was based on the 1978 British movie The Odd Job. The movie was an inspiration for the 2013 Kannada movie Victory.

Cast
 Shashi Kumar as ′Ganesha′
 Sithaara as Ganesha Wife
 Ramesh Bhat as policy agent Bhatta
 Silk Smitha as Contract Killer 
 Anant Nag as Lambhodhara Cameo appearance

Soundtrack 
"Ganda Hendathi Emnare" - P. B. Sreenivas 
"Bhagyada Lakshmi Bandaaythu" - S. Janaki, S. P. Balasubrahmanyam
"Don’T Worry Chinna" - S. P. Balasubrahmanyam
"Preethiya Selethave" - S. P. Balasubrahmanyam
"Come Come Darling" - S. Janaki
"Killer Naane Killer" - S. Janaki

References

1991 films
1990s Kannada-language films
Indian comedy films
Films scored by Rajan–Nagendra
Films directed by Phani Ramachandra